Usama Ali (born 26 April 1998) is a Pakistani cricketer. He made his List A debut for National Bank of Pakistan in the 2017–18 Departmental One Day Cup on 3 January 2018.

References

External links
 

1998 births
Living people
Pakistani cricketers
National Bank of Pakistan cricketers